The Ekavyāvahārika was one of the early Buddhist schools, and is thought to have separated from the Mahāsāṃghika sect during the reign of Aśoka.

History

Relationship to Mahāsāṃghika
Tāranātha viewed the Ekavyāvahārikas, Lokottaravādins, and Gokulikas as being essentially the same. He even viewed Ekavyāvahārika as being a general term for the Mahāsāṃghikas. The Ekavyāvahārikas, Gokulikas, and Lokottaravādins are the three groups that emerged from the first split in the Mahāsāṃghika sect. A.K. Warder notes that the Ekavyāvahārikas were hardly known in later times and may have simply have been considered part of the Mahāsāṃghika.

Early history
The 6th century CE Indian monk Paramārtha wrote that 200 years after the parinirvāṇa of the Buddha, much of the Mahāsāṃghika school moved north of Rājagṛha, and were divided over whether the Mahāyāna teachings should be incorporated formally into their Tripiṭaka. According to this account, they split into three groups based upon the relative manner and degree to which they accepted the authority of these Mahāyāna texts. According to Paramārtha, the Ekavyāvahārikas accepted the Mahāyāna sūtras as the words of the Buddha (buddhavacana).

Doctrines

Forty-eight theses
The Samayabhedoparacanacakra of Vasumitra regards the Ekavyāvahārikas, Gokulikas, and Lokottaravādins as being doctrinally indistinguishable. According to Vasumitra, 48 theses were held in common by these three Mahāsāṃghika sects. Of the 48 special theses attributed by the Samayabhedoparacanacakra to these sects, 20 points concern the supramundane nature of buddhas and bodhisattvas. According to the Samayabhedoparacanacakra, these four groups held that the Buddha is able to know all dharmas in a single moment of the mind. Yao Zhihua writes:

Trascendent speech
The name of the Ekavyāvahārikas refers to their doctrine that the Buddha speaks with a single and unified transcendent meaning. They emphasized the transcendence of the Buddha, asserting that he was eternally enlightened and essentially non-physical. Just as the words of the Buddha were held to be spoken with one transcendent meaning, the Four Noble Truths were understood to be perfectly realized with one wisdom.

Fundamentally pure mind
The Ekavyāvahārikas held that sentient beings possessed an originally or fundamentally pure mind, but that it has been encumbered and obscured by suffering.

References

See also
 Early Buddhist schools
 Nikaya Buddhism
 Schools of Buddhism

Nikaya schools
Mahāsāṃghika
Early Buddhist schools